The 1977–78 William & Mary Indians men's basketball team represented the College of William & Mary in intercollegiate basketball during the 1977–78 season. Under the first year of head coach Bruce Parkhill, the team finished the season 16–10. This was the 73rd season of the collegiate basketball program at William & Mary, whose nickname is now the Tribe.

After playing as members of the Southern Conference for the previous 41 season, William & Mary became an Independent.

Additionally, this was the final season of William & Mary's athletics teams bearing the Indian nickname. The following season, the college's athletic teams became the Tribe.

Schedule

|-
!colspan=9 style="background:#006400; color:#FFD700;"| Regular season

Source

References

William & Mary Tribe men's basketball seasons
William And Mary
William and Mary Indians Men's Basketball Team
William and Mary Indians Men's Basketball Team